Knapp is the name of some places in the U.S. state of Wisconsin:
Knapp, Dunn County, Wisconsin, a village
Knapp, Jackson County, Wisconsin, a town